An Stùc, meaning "The Peak" in Gaelic, is a conically shaped Scottish mountain in the Ben Lawers range to the north of Loch Tay. It has been listed as a Munro since 1997, having previously been considered a subsidiary top of the Ben Lawers range. It lies on the main ridge of the Ben Lawers range, and its southern and eastern slopes form part of the Ben Lawers National Nature Reserve, which is owned and managed by the National Trust for Scotland.

The normal routes of ascent are via the ridges from Ben Lawers or Meall Garbh, in combination with other summits in the range. It may also be ascended directly from the Lawers Burn to the east via a gully above Lochan nan Cat.

See also 
 Ben Nevis
 List of Munro mountains
 Mountains and hills of Scotland

References

Munros
Mountains and hills of the Southern Highlands
Mountains and hills of Perth and Kinross
One-thousanders of Scotland